Cowdery is a surname. Notable people with the surname include:

Clive Cowdery (born 1963), English businessman
John Cowdery (1930–2013), American politician
Josh Cowdery (born 1978), American actor
Mae Virginia Cowdery (1909–1953), American poet
Nicholas Cowdery (born 1946), Australian barrister
Oliver Cowdery (1806–1850), American Latter Day Saint
Warren A. Cowdery (1788–1851), American Latter Day Saint

See also
 Cowdrey (disambiguation)